Fiscus is an unincorporated community in Audubon County, Iowa, in the United States.

History
A post office was established in Fiscus in 1889, and remained in operation until it was discontinued in 1903. Adam Cain Fiscus was the minister at the Fiscus Church of Christ.

Fiscus' population was 12 in 1925.

References

Unincorporated communities in Audubon County, Iowa
1889 establishments in Iowa
Unincorporated communities in Iowa